Amalda crosnieri is a species of sea snail, a marine gastropod mollusc in the family Ancillariidae, the olives.

Description

Distribution

References

External links
  Kilburn R.N. (1977). Descriptions of new species of Amalda and Chilotygma (Gastropoda: Olividae: Ancillinae) with a note on the systematics of Amalda, Ancillus and Ancilista. Annals of the Natal Museum. 23(1): 13–21.

contusa
Gastropods described in 1993